Song Haus Music is an independent record label, self-release consultant, artist management and music publisher (Spenlock Music). Founded by Dane Spencer in 1998, Song Haus has released over 60 titles.  Rewind Records its reissue label has been a pioneer in the reissue market working with all major labels.

The following artists either are performing or have performed under Song Haus Music.

Current 
 Bryan Amsterdam
 Adjacent To Nothing
 Naomi Harlan
 Alastair Finn

Former 
 Kick Axe
 Spencer Bullock
 John Keane
 Colie Brice
 Tim Wray
Ken Tamplin
 Phil Vincent
 Faith Nation
 Britton
 New Machine
 Jade Redd
 Sojourn
 Brad Love
 Melodramus
 Rikk Beatty
 Lady and Gent
 The Young Electric
 Advent Horizon

See also
 List of record labels

References

External links
 

American record labels
Record labels established in 1998